Tápióbicske is a village in Pest county, Hungary.

The village was a site of the Battle of Tápióbicske in 1849.

References

Populated places in Pest County